Universal Hall is the eighth studio album by The Waterboys, released in 2003.  It is named after the theatre and performance hall at the Findhorn Foundation, which is pictured on the album cover. The album shows much more influence from folk music than its predecessor, A Rock in the Weary Land.  It is the first Waterboys album to feature Steve Wickham since Room to Roam, and therefore the first Waterboys album with all three core members of the post-reunion band.

Mike Scott describes the album as a "record containing one Irish reel and eleven spiritual songs that articulate - to the best of my ability - the vision that drives, challenges, sustains and transforms me".  The cover was designed by art director Steve Manson.

James Christopher Monger, writing for Allmusic, describes "Every Breath Is Yours" as "simplified", and "Nick Drake-cloned".  Scott thanks Liebe Pugh for the song.

"Seek the Light" is unique amongst Waterboys recordings for borrowing heavily from contemporary dance music, specifically electronica.  It includes part of the song "Etheric Currents" from the album Cosmic Breath, by May East and Craig Gibsone, both of whom also appear on "Seek the Light".  East plays an instrument, the sandawa, which the album's recording notes claims "reproduces the frequency of the speed of light".

"The Dance at the Crossroads" is the "one Irish reel" mentioned by Scott.  It is a short instrumental written by Wickham, who performs the song on fiddle.  Scott plays both tambron and rotosphere, while Naiff plays piano and flute.

Track listing
Tracks written by Mike Scott, except as noted.

 "This Light Is for the World" – 3:31  
 "The Christ in You" – 3:18  
 "Silent Fellowship" – 4:59  
 "Every Breath Is Yours" – 4:28  
 "Peace of Iona" – 6:13  
 "Ain't No Words for the Things I'm Feeling" – 2:32  
 "Seek the Light" (May East, Craig Gibsone, Scott) – 2:37  
 "I've Lived Here Before" (Liam Ó Maonlaí, Scott) – 3:08  
 "Always Dancing, Never Getting Tired" – 3:16  
 "The Dance at the Crossroads" (Instrumental, Steve Wickham) – 1:13  
 "E.B.O.L." – 2:15  
 "Universal Hall" (Scott, Wickham) – 6:23

Personnel
May East - sanza  
Scott Gamble - djembe, hand drums, djouak
Craig Gibsone - didjeridu  
Findlay Grant - drums  
Chris Madden - tambourine, loops, engineer, mixing
Richard Naiff - flute, piano
Mike Scott - organ, synthesizer, acoustic guitar, harmonium, electric piano, vocals, percussion instruments, piano, tambourine, twelve-string guitar
Steve Wickham - fiddle

Ballet music
In 2007 British choreographer Christopher Bruce created a new work for the ballettmainz of the German Staatstheater Mainz using six songs from this album. The ballet premiered on 8 November 2007 in Mainz.

Order of the songs:
 I've Lived Here Before 
 Always Dancing, Never Getting Tired
 Peace of Iona
 Seek the Light
 The Christ in You
 The Dance at the Crossroads

Charts

Notes

External links
 Lyrics at the official Waterboys website
 Official forum Chord requests are often fulfilled at "Musician's Corner"

The Waterboys albums
2003 albums
Findhorn community